Lucy Iskanyan is a Syria politician who has been a Member of the Syrian Parliament since the 2020 election. She is an Armenian Christian and a member of the Ba'ath Party.

Political career 
In Parliament, she chairs the Syria-Armenia Friendship Group.

In April 2022, during a meeting of the Syria-Armenian Friendship Group, she proposed to upgrade the agreement between the two countries, in particular, on the issue of mutually granting student scholarships. She also claimed that despite the challenges caused by the ongoing war, scientific and educational institutions operating in Syria never stopped their activities.

See also 

 List of members of the Parliament of Syria, 2020-2024

References 

Living people
20th-century births
Members of the People's Assembly of Syria
Syrian Christians
Syrian people of Armenian descent
21st-century Syrian women politicians
Arab Socialist Ba'ath Party – Syria Region politicians